The relationships of the English musician Paul McCartney include engagements to Dot Rhone and actress Jane Asher, and marriages to Linda Eastman, Heather Mills, and Nancy Shevell.

McCartney had a three-year relationship with Dot Rhone in Liverpool, and bought her a gold ring in Hamburg after she became pregnant in 1960 and they were to be married. However, she miscarried and they did not marry, but stayed together until the autumn of 1962. In London, McCartney had a five-year relationship with Asher after they met in April 1963 and lived in her parents' house for three years. He wrote several songs at the Ashers' house, including "Yesterday". Asher inspired other songs, such as "And I Love Her", "You Won't See Me", and "I'm Looking Through You". On 25 December 1967, they announced their engagement, but they separated in July 1968.

McCartney met the American photographer Linda Eastman in The Bag O’ Nails club in London on 15 May 1967, while still with Asher. They met again at the launch party for the Beatles' Sgt. Pepper's Lonely Hearts Club Band on 19 May 1967. In May 1968, McCartney met Eastman again in New York, and they were married on 12 March 1969. They had three children together and remained married until her death from breast cancer in 1998.

McCartney appeared publicly beside Heather Mills at a party in January 2000 to celebrate her 32nd birthday. On 11 June 2002, they were married at Castle Leslie in Glaslough, Ireland. They had one child, Beatrice, in 2003 but were living apart by May 2006. In July 2006, British newspapers announced that McCartney had petitioned for divorce. On 17 March 2008, the financial terms of the divorce were finalised, which awarded Mills £24.3 million ($38.5 million). In November 2007, McCartney started dating Nancy Shevell, who was a member of the board of the New York Metropolitan Transportation Authority and is vice president of the family-owned New England Motor Freight. It was announced on 6 May 2011, that the two had become engaged, and they married in London on 9 October 2011.

Jim and Mary McCartney
With encouragement from his father, Jim, Paul started playing the family piano and wrote "When I'm Sixty-Four" on it. Jim advised Paul to take some music lessons, which he did, but soon realised that he preferred to learn 'by ear' (as his father had done) and because he never paid attention in music classes. After Paul and brother Michael (stage name Mike McGear) became interested in music, Jim connected the radio in the living room to extension cords connected to two pairs of Bakelite headphones so that they could listen to Radio Luxembourg at night when they were in bed.

After first meeting John Lennon, Jim warned Paul that John would get him "into trouble", although he later allowed The Quarrymen to rehearse in the dining room at Forthlin Road in the evenings. Jim was reluctant to let the teenage Paul go to Hamburg with the Beatles until Paul said the group would earn £15 per week each. As this was more than he earned himself, Jim finally agreed, but only after a visit from the group's then-manager, Allan Williams, who said that Jim should not worry. Bill Harry recalled that Jim was probably "the Beatles' biggest fan", and was extremely proud of Paul's success. Shelagh Johnson—later to become director of the Beatles' Museum in Liverpool—said that Jim's outward show of pride embarrassed his son. Jim enlisted Michael's help when sorting through the ever-increasing sacks of fan letters that were delivered to Forthlin Road, with both composing "personal" responses that were supposedly from Paul. Michael later succeeded on his own with the group the Scaffold.

Jim, Angie and Ruth McCartney 
Jim was introduced to a young widow, Angie and her infant daughter, Ruth by a close family friend in 1963. He soon proposed marriage and Angie readily accepted. Paul, who was in London was informed by telephone of her acceptance and a few hours later he arrived at the Cheshire home, he had gifted to his father. He and his brother Michael both approved of their future step mother and step sister and they soon got married over the border in Wales in 1964, Jim went on to adopt Ruth. 

Twelve years later on the 18 March 1976, Jim (whose health had recently deteriorated) died while Paul and Linda were performing abroad with Wings, they decided not to attend the family funeral which kept Jim's death and funeral away from the media. Relations with Angie were to cool, and after she moved to London and had a failed business, she and Paul's stepsister, Ruth, moved to Playa del Rey, Los Angeles in 1990, where they started a successful website design venture and Tea and Wine companies which they run with Ruth's husband to this day.

Songs 

Paul wrote "I Lost My Little Girl" just after Mary had died, and explained that it was a subconscious reference to his late mother. He has speculated that he subconsciously wrote the song "Yesterday" about his mother as well. He also wrote "Golden Slumbers" at his father's house in Heswall, and said the lyrics were taken from Ruth McCartney's sheet-music copy of Thomas Dekker's lullaby—also called "Golden Slumbers"—that Ruth had left on the piano at Rembrandt. Hunter Davies, who was at Jim's house at the time doing an interview for his Beatles' biography, remembered Jim listening to an acetate disc of "When I'm Sixty-Four". Davies wrote that Paul originally wrote the song specifically for his younger father and then recorded it, as Jim was by then 64 years old and had remarried two years previously. Paul wrote "Let It Be", because of a dream he had in 1968. He said that he had dreamt of his mother, and the "Mother Mary" lyric was about her. He later said, "It was great to visit with her again. I felt very blessed to have that dream. So that got me writing 'Let It Be'."

In 1974, Paul recorded a song his father had previously written, entitled "Walking in the Park with Eloise", which was released by Wings under the pseudonym, "The Country Hams". The Country Hams' single was backed with a tune entitled "Bridge on the River Suite". Both songs can be found on the CD Venus and Mars from The Paul McCartney Collection.

Early relationships

One of McCartney's first girlfriends, in 1957, was called Layla, a name he remembered as being unusual in Liverpool at the time. She was slightly older than McCartney and used to ask him to baby-sit with her. Julie Arthur, another girlfriend, was Ted Ray's niece.

McCartney's first serious girlfriend in Liverpool was seventeen-year-old Dorothy "Dot" Rhone (a bank clerk or a cashier at a chemist's, according to varying accounts), whom he had met at The Casbah Club in 1959. McCartney picked out the clothes he liked Rhone to wear and told her which make-up to use, also paying for her to have her blonde hair done in the style of Brigitte Bardot, whom both he and John Lennon idolised. He disliked Rhone seeing her friends, and stopped her from smoking, even though he did so himself. When McCartney first went to Hamburg with The Beatles, he wrote regular letters to Rhone, and she accompanied Lennon's girlfriend, Cynthia Powell, to Hamburg when the group played there again in 1962. According to Rhone, McCartney bought her a gold ring in Hamburg, a leather skirt, took her sightseeing, and was very attentive and caring. For the time Rhone was there, the couple lived in a bungalow by the Hamburg docks that belonged to Rosa, a former cleaner at the Indra club. McCartney admitted that he had other girlfriends in Hamburg when Rhone was in Liverpool, admitting that they were usually strippers, who knew a lot more about sex than Liverpool girls.
 
Rhone later rented a room in the same house as Cynthia Lennon was living, with McCartney contributing to the rent. According to Mark Lewisohn's biography Tune In, Dot became pregnant in 1960, and Paul's father, Jim, while being shocked, was nonetheless rather pleased at the prospect of becoming a grandfather. They were to be married soon, but Dot had a miscarriage. She still wore the ring he gave her, and they stayed together until the autumn of 1962 when Paul broke up with her, knowing she'd eventually want to get married (John & Cynthia had recently married in August 1962 due to her pregnancy), and he didn't want to marry anyone at the time because was still only 20 years old.

He then had a brief relationship with Thelma Pickles, who had previously dated Lennon. She later married Liverpool poet Roger McGough, but she remembered McCartney as growing from a "plump young schoolboy into someone very much his own person" during their time together. McCartney also had a fiery on–off relationship with Iris Caldwell, the younger sister of singer Rory Storm, who refused to bow to McCartney's demands. After one argument, Caldwell poured a bowl of sugar over his head, but when McCartney turned up the next day, she had to phone her new boyfriend, George Harrison, to cancel their date.

Rhone later emigrated to Toronto, Canada, and McCartney met her again when the Beatles played there, and then again with Wings. Rhone later said that "Love of the Loved" and "P.S. I Love You" were written about her. Years later, Cynthia Lennon gave Rhone the gold ring that McCartney had bought Rhone, having once tried it on while Rhone was washing dishes, and forgotten to take it off. Rhone is now a grandmother and lives in Mississauga, Ontario.

Asher and Eastman 

McCartney first met British actress Jane Asher on 18 April 1963 when the Beatles performed at the Royal Albert Hall, in London, after a photographer asked them to pose with her. They were then interviewed by Asher for the BBC, with Asher being photographed screaming at them like a fan. McCartney soon met Asher's family: Margaret, her mother was a music teacher, and Asher's father Richard was a physician. Her brother, Peter, was a member of Peter and Gordon, and her younger sister, Clare, was also an actress. McCartney later gave "A World Without Love" to Peter and Gordon, as well as "Nobody I Know". Both songs were hits for the duo. McCartney took up residence at the Ashers' house at 57 Wimpole Street, London, and lived there for nearly three years. During his time there McCartney met writers such as Bertrand Russell, Harold Pinter, and Len Deighton. He wrote several songs at the Ashers', including "Yesterday", and worked on songs with Lennon in the basement music room. Asher inspired many songs, such as "And I Love Her", "You Won't See Me", and "I'm Looking Through You".

On 13 April 1965, McCartney bought a £40,000 three-storey Regency house at 7 Cavendish Avenue, St John's Wood, London, and spent a further £20,000 renovating it. He thanked the Ashers by paying for the decoration of the front of their house. On 15 May 1967, McCartney met American photographer Linda Eastman at a Georgie Fame concert at The Bag O'Nails in London. Eastman was in the UK on an assignment to take photographs of "swinging sixties" musicians in London. They met again four days later at the launch party for the Sgt. Pepper album at Beatles' manager Brian Epstein's house in Belgravia, but after her assignment was completed, she flew back to New York. On 25 December 1967, McCartney and Asher announced their engagement, and she accompanied McCartney to India in February and March 1968.

Asher broke off the engagement in the summer of 1968, apparently because of an alleged affair Paul was having. McCartney and Asher later attempted to mend their relationship, but finally broke up in July 1968. Asher has consistently refused to publicly discuss that part of her life.

Marriage to Linda Eastman

In May 1968, McCartney met Linda Eastman again in New York when Lennon and McCartney were there to announce the formation of Apple Corps. In September, McCartney phoned her and asked her to fly over to London. Six months later they were married at a small civil ceremony, when Eastman was four months pregnant with their child, Mary McCartney, at Marylebone Town Hall on 12 March 1969. He later said that his wife was the woman who "gave me the strength and courage to work again", after the break-up of the Beatles. McCartney adopted her daughter from her first marriage, Heather, and had three children together: Mary, Stella, and James. McCartney taught Linda to play keyboards, and permanently included her in the line-up of Wings.

Linda died of breast cancer at age 56 in Tucson, Arizona on 17 April 1998; McCartney denied rumours that her death was an assisted suicide. Along with eight other British composers, he contributed to the choral album A Garland for Linda, and dedicated his classical album Ecce Cor Meum to his late wife. McCartney has said that he and Linda spent less than a week apart during their entire marriage, excluding McCartney's incarceration in Tokyo on drug charges in January 1980.

Marriage to Heather Mills

After having sparked the interest of the tabloids about his appearances at events with former model, amputee, and campaigner against landmines Heather Mills, McCartney appeared publicly beside her at a party in January 2000 to celebrate her 32nd birthday. On 11 June 2002, McCartney married Mills in an elaborate ceremony at Castle Leslie in Glaslough, County Monaghan, Ireland, where more than 300 guests were invited; the reception included a vegetarian banquet. On 28 October 2003, Mills gave birth to Beatrice Milly McCartney. She was reportedly named after Mills' mother Beatrice, and McCartney's Aunt Milly.

On 29 July 2006, British newspapers announced that McCartney had petitioned for divorce, which sparked a media furore. On 17 March 2008, the financial terms of the divorce were finalised, with a settlement awarding Mills £24.3 million. The settlement stated that McCartney pay their four-year-old daughter Beatrice's nanny school fees as well as pay Beatrice £35,000 a year until she is 17, or when she ends her secondary education. After the divorce ruling, Justice Hugh Bennett said that, throughout the case, Mills was "inconsistent, inaccurate and less than candid" while McCartney was "honest." On 12 May 2008, Justice Bennett issued a decree nisi, which would become final after a period of six months apart.

Marriage to Nancy Shevell

McCartney started dating Nancy Shevell in November 2007. Shevell is a cousin of journalist Barbara Walters. She was born in Edison, New Jersey, on 20 November 1959, and grew up there with her family.

She was a graduate of J. P. Stevens High School and Arizona State University, was a member of the board of the New York Metropolitan Transportation Authority as well as vice president of a family-owned transportation conglomerate that includes New England Motor Freight. She resigned from the MTA board in January 2012. It was announced on 6 May 2011 that the two had become engaged. On 9 October 2011, McCartney and Shevell were married at Marylebone Town Hall, where his first wedding took place in 1969. The couple attended Yom Kippur synagogue services prior to the wedding, with respect for Shevell's Jewish faith, but did not seek a religious blessing for their union. Upon their marriage, Shevell became Lady McCartney. McCartney wrote the song "My Valentine", from his 2012 album Kisses on the Bottom, about Shevell.

Notes

Sources

 
 
 
 
 
 
 
 
 

McCartney, Paul
Paul McCartney